Chimmie Fadden is a 1915 American silent comedy film directed, written and edited Cecil B. DeMille. The film starred Victor Moore in the title role and is based on the play and short story of the same name by Edward W. Townsend. It was followed by a sequel Chimmie Fadden Out West. It is a surviving film formerly thought lost for decades. A print is kept at Cinemateket-Svenska Filminstitutet, Stockholm.

Cast
 Victor Moore as Chimmie Fadden
 Raymond Hatton as Larry, His Brother
 Mrs. Lewis McCord as Mrs. Fadden, Their Mother
 Ernest Joy as Van Cartlandt, A Millionaire
 Anita King as Fanny, His Daughter
 Camille Astor as Hortense, French Maid
 Tom Forman as Antoine, Butler-Thief

See also
List of rediscovered films

References

External links

1915 films
1915 comedy films
1910s rediscovered films
Silent American comedy films
American silent feature films
American black-and-white films
American films based on plays
Films based on short fiction
Films directed by Cecil B. DeMille
Paramount Pictures films
Rediscovered American films
1910s American films